La Serna is a town in the Arenas de Iguña municipality of the Spanish region of Cantabria. In 2004, La Serna had a population of 238. The church of the Assumption, from the 11th century, and the house of Quevedo Bustamante, from the 17th century, can be found in La Serna.

References
Cantabria 102 Municipios (Spanish)

Towns in Spain
Populated places in Cantabria